is a 1955 Japanese crime drama film written and directed by Kaneto Shindo.

Plot
After an opening sequence showing a group of people hijacking a post office truck, a montage of press coverage and police investigations, and the arrest of Akiko, one of the gang members, the film switches to a flashback narration covering the preceding events: A group of 5 insurance salesmen and -women are facing dismissal for not accomplishing the company's sales plan, with all of them already living under precarious social conditions. War widows Akika and Fujibayashi have to raise their children on their own, Yoshikawa and Mikawa, one a hapless screenwriter, one a former car factory worker who lost his job after an accident, can hardly feed their families, and Harashima, a bank clerk fired for his union activities, lives in an unhappy marriage with a wife who refuses to divorce him without severance. Out of desperation, they decide to rob a post office money transport on its daily route. The coup is successful, but later the members of the group, titled "wolves" in the press, are caught one after another. The last to be arrested is Akiko, who needed the money for an operation on her disfigured son, and is already being expected by the police at the hospital where her son is treated.

Cast
 Nobuko Otowa as Akiko Yano
 Jun Hamamura as Harashima
 Ichirō Sugai as Fusajirō Yoshikawa
 Sanae Takasugi as Tomie Fujibayashi
 Taiji Tonoyama as Yoshiyuki Mikawa
 Bokuzen Hidari
 Tanie Kitabayashi
 Masao Mishima
 Tomoko Naraoka
 Eitarō Ozawa
 Sumie Sasaki
 Masami Shimojō
 Tsutomu Shimomoto
 Kinzō Shin as Hideo Yamamoto
 Kin Sugai
 Yoshiko Tsubouchi
 Eijirō Tōno
 Jūkichi Uno

Production
Shindo had based his screenplay for Wolf on an actual event, the robbing of a truck by a group of five insurance agents, including two women, who had no previous criminal records and acted out of sheer poverty. The film was produced by Shindo's and actor Taiji Tonoyama's own production company Kindai Eiga Kyōkai after Nikkatsu studios backed out of the project shortly before shooting began. Itō Takerō of the independent company Dokuritsu Eiga helped in funding the production. Wolf was shown in only a few independent cinemas and was a failure with the audience. Tonoyama, who appeared in many of Shindo's films, said that this was his favourite role of all of the director's films.

References

External links
 
 

1955 films
1950s Japanese-language films
1950s crime drama films
Japanese crime drama films
1955 drama films
Films directed by Kaneto Shindo
Films scored by Akira Ifukube
Japanese black-and-white films
1950s Japanese films